Frank Skinner (December 31, 1897 – October 9, 1968) was an American film composer and arranger.

Career
In 2014, Dallas pre-swing orchestra The Singapore Slingers released a fifteen-track CD homage to Skinner's arrangements.

Partial filmography

 The Rage of Paris (1938)
 Son of Frankenstein (1939)
 Big Town Czar (1939)
 Charlie McCarthy, Detective (1939)
 The Spirit of Culver (1939)
 The Sun Never Sets  (1939)
 Rio (1939)
 Destry Rides Again (1939)
 The Invisible Man Returns (1940)
 The House of the Seven Gables (1940)
 Green Hell (1940)
 My Little Chickadee (1940)
 Hired Wife (1940)
 When the Daltons Rode (1940)
 Seven Sinners (1940)
 Back Street (1941)
 The Wolf Man (1941, with Hans J. Salter, uncredited)
 South of Tahiti (1941)
 Appointment for Love (1941)
 Hellzapoppin (1941)
 Too Many Blondes (1941)
 The Lady from Cheyenne (1941)
 Lady in a Jam (1942)
 Who Done It? (1942)
 Jail House Blues (1942)
 Saboteur (1942)
 Broadway (1942)
 Ride 'Em Cowboy (1942)
 Eagle Squadron (1942)
 Sherlock Holmes and the Voice of Terror (1942)
 Nightmare (1942)
 Sherlock Holmes and the Secret Weapon (1942)
 Arabian Nights (1942)
 Pittsburgh (1942)
 Hers to Hold (1943)
 White Savage (1943)
 Two Tickets to London (1943)
 Sherlock Holmes in Washington (1943)
 The Amazing Mrs. Holliday (1943)
 Fired Wife (1943)
 We've Never Been Licked (1943)
 Gung Ho! (1943)
 Hi, Beautiful (1944)
 Destiny (1944)
 The Suspect (1944)
 Frontier Gal (1945)
 The Runaround (1946)
 Black Angel (1946)
 Swell Guy (1946)
 The Egg and I (1947)
 Ride the Pink Horse (1947)
 Smash-Up, the Story of a Woman (1947)
 The Exile (1947)
 I'll Be Yours (1947)
 For the Love of Mary (1948)
 Family Honeymoon (1948)
 The Naked City (1948)
 Hazard (1948)
 Abbott and Costello Meet Frankenstein (1948)
 Tap Roots (1948)
 The Fighting O'Flynn (1949)
 The Life of Riley (1949)
 The Lady Gambles (1949)
 Tulsa (1949)
 Sword in the Desert (1949)
 The Gal Who Took the West (1949)
 Free for All (1949)
 Francis (1950)
 Comanche Territory (1950)
 Louisa (1950)
 One Way Street (1950)
 The Desert Hawk (1950)
 The Sleeping City (1950)
 Harvey (1950)
 Double Crossbones (1951)
 Katie Did It (1951)
 Bedtime for Bonzo (1951)
 Francis Goes to the Races (1951)
 Bright Victory (1951)
 The Mark of the Renegade (1951)
 The Lady Pays Off (1951)
 The Raging Tide (1951)
 Week-End with Father (1951)
 No Room for the Groom (1952)
 Bonzo Goes to College (1952)
 It Grows on Trees (1952)
 The World in His Arms (1952)
 Because of You (1952)
 Desert Legion (1953)
 Thunder Bay (1953)
 The Man from the Alamo (1953)
 Wings of the Hawk (1953)
 The Stand at Apache River (1953)
 Back to God's Country (1953)
 Forbidden (1953)
 Taza, Son of Cochise (1954)
 Magnificent Obsession (1954)
 Chief Crazy Horse (1955)
 The Shrike (1955)
 Foxfire (1955)
 One Desire (1955)
 All That Heaven Allows (1955)
 Never Say Goodbye (1956)
 Star in the Dust (1956)
 The Rawhide Years (1956)
 Written on the Wind (1956)
 The Snow Queen (1957 film) (1957)
 The Tattered Dress (1957)
 Interlude (1957)
 Tammy and the Bachelor (1957)
 Man of a Thousand Faces (1957)
 My Man Godfrey (1957)
 This Happy Feeling (1958)
 The Tarnished Angels (1958)
 Kathy O' (1958)
 The Perfect Furlough (1958)
 Imitation of Life (1959)
 Portrait in Black (1960)
 Midnight Lace (1960)
 Back Street (1961)
 Tammy and the Doctor (1963)
 Captain Newman, M.D. (1963)
 The Ugly American (1963)
 Bullet for a Badman (1964)
 Shenandoah (1965)
 The Appaloosa (1966)
 Madame X (1966)

References

External links
 

1897 births
1968 deaths
American film score composers
American male film score composers
American music arrangers
Chicago Musical College alumni
20th-century American composers
20th-century American male musicians